Alexandru Marinescu (born 23 October 1932) is a Romanian water polo player. He competed in the men's tournament at the 1956 Summer Olympics.

See also
 Romania men's Olympic water polo team records and statistics
 List of men's Olympic water polo tournament goalkeepers

References

External links
 

1932 births
Living people
Romanian male water polo players
Water polo goalkeepers
Olympic water polo players of Romania
Water polo players at the 1956 Summer Olympics
Place of birth missing (living people)